Mothers, Sisters, Daughters & Wives is an EP by Voxtrot, released on April 4, 2006, in the United States and September 25, 2006 worldwide.

Track listings
CD released by Cult Hero Records on April 4, 2006, (US only) and Beggars Group / Playlouder on September 25, 2006, (worldwide except US.)
 "Mothers, Sisters, Daughters & Wives"
 "Fast Asleep"
 "Rise Up in the Dirt"
 "Four Long Days"
 "Soft & Warm"

7" released by Full Time Hobby Recordings (FTH021S) on June 12, 2006, (UK only).
 "Mothers, Sisters, Daughters & Wives"
 "Rise Up in the Dirt"

References 

Voxtrot albums
2006 EPs